The fifth season of the American crime thriller television series The Blacklist premiered on NBC on September 27, 2017, with a timeslot change from Thursday at 10:00 PM to Wednesday at 8:00 PM. The season was produced by Davis Entertainment, Universal Television and Sony Pictures Television, and the executive producers are Jon Bokenkamp, John Davis, John Eisendrath, John Fox, and Joe Carnahan. The season contained 22 episodes and concluded on May 16, 2018. The season aired the series' 100th episode.

Overview 
Following the war between Raymond Reddington and Mr. Kaplan in the previous season, Raymond's greatest secret - in the form of a suitcase containing an unidentified human skeleton - has been missing and Raymond and Dembe Zuma desperately search for it. During the search, they are faced by a new adversary Ian Garvey (Jonny Coyne), a corrupt U. S. Marshall and drug kingpin who wants the suitcase to undermine Raymond's criminal empire, putting a danger to Raymond's allies, especially to Elizabeth Keen. Elizabeth questions the relationship with Raymond about whether he is her biological father or not as was hinted at the end of Season 4. She later discovers the existence of one person (Fiona Dourif) who has an unexpected connection to Reddington, leading to the unsettling discovery at the end of the season.

Cast

Main cast
 James Spader as Raymond "Red" Reddington
 Megan Boone as Elizabeth Keen
 Diego Klattenhoff as Donald Ressler 
 Ryan Eggold as Tom Keen
 Harry Lennix as Harold Cooper
 Amir Arison as Aram Mojtabai
 Mozhan Marnò as Samar Navabi
 Hisham Tawfiq as Dembe Zuma

Recurring
 Michael Aronov as Joe "Smokey" Putnum, Red's new henchman, circus carney and master of logistics.
 Aida Turturro as Heddie Hawkins, Red's new accountant and money manager.
 James Carpinello as Henry Prescott, a fixer who is extorting Agent Ressler.
 Jonny Coyne as Ian Garvey, a corrupt U. S. Marshal and drug kingpin.
 John Noble as Raleigh Sinclair III, AKA The Alibi, who can create near-perfect doubles and alibis.
 Fiona Dourif as Lillian Roth/Jennifer Reddington, the daughter of Raymond Reddington and Liz's ally.
 Piter Marek as Nik Korpal, a doctor and Liz's former boyfriend.
 Karl Miller as Pete McGee, a disgraced former doctor who assists Tom with his search for the true identity of the bones.
 Ana Nogueira as Lena Mercer, Pete's girlfriend who helps Tom find Pete.
 Lenny Venito as Tony Pagliaro/The Mailman, a corrupt U. S. Postal Service employee and Red's henchman. 
 Evan Parke as Detective Norman Singleton, lead investigator and a member of Garvey's task force.
 Clark Middleton as Glen Carter, a DMV employee who occasionally assists Red.
 Happy Anderson as Bobby Navarro, one of Garvey's henchmen.
 Shane Patrick Kearns as Judson, one of Garvey's henchmen.
 Jonathan Holtzman as Chuck

Episodes

Reception

Ratings

Critical response
The fifth season of The Blacklist received positive reviews from critics. The review aggregator website Rotten Tomatoes reports a 100% approval rating based on five reviews, with an average score of 8.5/10.

References

External links
 
 

2017 American television seasons
2018 American television seasons
5